Al-Ma'shar is a sub-district located in Al Makhadir District, Ibb Governorate, Yemen. Al-Ma'shar had a population of  5453 as of 2004.

References 

Sub-districts in Al Makhadir District